Internationella Engelska Skolan (IES), or the International English School, is a Swedish corporation which operates independent schools (or “free schools”). IES was founded in 1993 by the American teacher Barbara Bergström who moved to Sweden in 1968. IES schools are based on the idea of bilingual education, with up to half of teaching being performed in English by native English-speaking teachers recruited from mainly Canada, the US, the UK and South Africa. IES schools are also known for a traditional type of order and structure, contributing to a school environment “in which teachers can teach and students learn”. This is implemented under the concept of “tough love”, which was also the title of a book published in 2018 describing the origin and concepts of IES, written by Hans and Barbara Bergstrom.

IES is the largest independent school organisation in Sweden in Grundskolan (the compulsory first nine years of the school system). In 2021-22, IES operates 43 schools in Sweden with around 30,000 students, mainly primary schools with grades 4-9, in Bromma, Borås, Enskede, Eskilstuna, Falun, Gävle, Gothenburg (Krokslätt and Johanneberg), Halmstad, Helsingborg, Hässelby, Hässleholm, Huddinge, Järfälla, Jönköping, Karlstad, Kista, Kungsbacka, Landskrona, Liljeholmen, Linköping, Lund, Länna, Nacka strand, Sigtuna, Skellefteå, Skärholmen, Solna, Sundbyberg, Sundsvall, Södertälje, Tyresö, Täby, Upplands Väsby, Uppsala, Umeå, Värmdö, Älvsjö, Årsta, Örebro and Östersund. The organisation also operates several schools in Spain.

Swedish schools are funded via the national voucher system for education, with money following the family's choice of school. This enables families to apply to attend schools outside the area where they live and without any cost. All students in Sweden can choose to attend a municipal or an independent school of their choice.

In August 2012, Barbara Bergstrom sold 75% of the company to the American, Boston-based, equity fund TA Associates, closely connected  to leading American universities and foundations. In September 2016, IES went public at Nasdaq Stockholm. In the fall of 2020, TA sold its ownership to the German-based investment firm Paradigm AG, funded by the Swede Jan Hummel and focused on investments in quality companies in Northern Europe. Thereafter, the company was delisted from the stock market. Its two active owners are currently Paradigm and The Hans and Barbara Bergstrom Foundation, to which the founder has donated all remaining shares in IES. Barbara Bergstrom is chairman of the IES Holding company, with Jan Hummel and Carola Lemne as board members. Carola Lemne is chairman of the board of the operational company, IES AB. CEO is Anna Sörelius-Nordenborg.

The company has around 3,000 employees.  Its headquarters is located in Täby, just north of Stockholm.

See also
 Education in Stockholm
 National Agency for Education

References

External links
 Internationella Engelska Skolan website, accessed July, 2021.
 Internationella Engelska Gymnasiet -, accessed July, 2021.

International schools in Sweden
Educational institutions established in 1993
Private schools in Sweden
Education in Uppsala
1993 establishments in Sweden